Khelaghar Samaj Kallyan Samity is a Bangladeshi cricket team that has played List A cricket in the Dhaka Premier League in 2013–14, 2016–17, 2017–18 and 2021–22. Its name translates as "Khelaghar Social Welfare Association". Khelaghar is a patriotic youth cultural organization founded in Dacca in 1952, which has over 500 branches around Bangladesh.

Playing history
In the inaugural List A status season of the League in 2013–14, captained by Faisal Hossain, Khelaghar Samaj Kallyan Samity finished last, with one win from 10 matches, and were relegated.

In 2014–15, in the non-List-A Dhaka First Division League, Khelaghar Samaj Kallyan Samity finished sixth with eight wins and eight losses; in 2015-16 they finished first in Group B of the Dhaka First Division League, and were promoted back to the Dhaka Premier League for 2016–17, captained by Nafees Iqbal. He also captained the team in 2017–18.

In March 2018, they reached the Super League section of the 2017–18 Dhaka Premier Division Cricket League. It was the first time the team had reached that section of the competition. In the 2021-22 competition they finished last, and faced relegation again.

List A record
 2013-14: 10 matches, won 1, finished twelfth
 2016-17: 13 matches, won 5, finished tenth
 2017-18: 16 matches, won 8, finished fifth
 2018-19: 11 matches, won 3, finished ninth
 2021-22: 12 matches, won 2, finished last (eleventh)

Current squad
Players with international caps are listed in bold

Records
Khelaghar Samaj Kallyan Samity's highest individual List A score is 115 not out by Mahidul Islam Ankon against Agrani Bank Cricket Club in 2017–18. The best bowling figures are 6 for 18 by Tanvir Islam against Partex Sporting Club in 2016–17.

References

External links
 Khelaghar Samaj Kallyan Samity at CricketArchive
 Khelaghar Samaj Kallyan Samity at Cricinfo

Dhaka Premier Division Cricket League teams